Frostbite, in comics, may refer to:

 Frostbite (G.I. Joe), a character that has appeared in a number of G.I. Joe comics
 Frostbite, a character from Wildstorm Comics
 Frostbite, a Marvel Comics character and enemy of Iron Man
 Frostbite, a Marvel Comics character who was a member of the team in X-Men 2099
 Frostbite, a character that appeared in DC Comics' Young Heroes in Love
 Frostbite, a DC Comics character that appeared in Superman: A Tale of Five Cities, is the sister of Ice
 Frostbite (Sanna Strand), a Marvel Comics character who was introduced in Battleworld Runaways

References

See also
Frostbite (disambiguation)